Mitsuhiro Sakamoto   is a Japanese mixed martial artist. He competed in the Bantamweight division.

Mixed martial arts record

|-
| Draw
| align=center| 2-0-3
| Norio Nishiyama
| Draw
| Shooto: Shooter's Passion
| 
| align=center| 2
| align=center| 5:00
| Setagaya, Tokyo, Japan
| 
|-
| Draw
| align=center| 2-0-2
| Takeyasu Hirono
| Draw
| Shooto: Las Grandes Viajes 4
| 
| align=center| 2
| align=center| 5:00
| Tokyo, Japan
| 
|-
| Win
| align=center| 2-0-1
| Masaru Gokita
| Decision (majority)
| Shooto: Reconquista 2
| 
| align=center| 2
| align=center| 5:00
| Tokyo, Japan
| 
|-
| Win
| align=center| 1-0-1
| Jin Akimoto
| Decision (majority)
| Shooto: Let's Get Lost
| 
| align=center| 3
| align=center| 3:00
| Tokyo, Japan
| 
|-
| Draw
| align=center| 0-0-1
| Jin Akimoto
| Draw
| Shooto: Vale Tudo Junction 3
| 
| align=center| 3
| align=center| 3:00
| Tokyo, Japan
|

See also
List of male mixed martial artists

References

External links
 
 Mitsuhiro Sakamoto at mixedmartialarts.com

Japanese male mixed martial artists
Bantamweight mixed martial artists
Living people
Year of birth missing (living people)